Gati Limited is an Indian logistics company, headquartered in Hyderabad, Telangana. It offers surface and air express logistics, warehousing and supply chain, air freight and e-commerce services. Gati has offices in all major states of India. Gati was founded in 1989 and first started operations between Madras (now Chennai) and Madurai.

In 2020, it was acquired by Allcargo Logistics. Shashi Kiran Shetty, CMD, Allcargo Logistics Ltd., currently serves as the Chairman. Gati is listed on the National Stock Exchange and Bombay Stock Exchange.

History

Early history 
Gati began in 1989 and started providing same-day courier and distribution services and courier management between Chennai and Madurai. The company expanded to Hyderabad, Bangalore (now Bengaluru), Chennai and Hosur within the same year.

It became the first company in India to start providing the delivery date on the docket and started offering a money back guarantee. The company was incorporated in 1995 as Gati Corporation Ltd.

1996–2000 
Introduced 3PL in India

Began offering multi-modal services, courier services and international operations to SAARC countries

2001–2008: Growth and expansion 
Launched Vehicle Tracking System, a centralised computer system to manage people, packages and vehicles in real time

Created a centralized call centre in Nagpur.

2009–2012 
Gati signed a joint venture agreement with Kintetsu World Express for their express distribution and supply chain business to form Gati–KWE, which is a subsidiary of Gati.

Introduced its e-commerce logistics services

2020 
Strategic acquisition by Allcargo Logistics and Gati's transition into An Allcargo Company

GATI-KWE
Gati-Kintetsu Express Private Limited (Gati-KWE) is a Joint Venture between Gati and  Japan's Kintetsu World Express (KWE) where KWE holds 30% stake in Gati-KWE and Gati holds the remaining 70%.

References 

Companies based in Hyderabad, India
Logistics companies of India
Transport companies established in 1989
Indian companies established in 1989
1989 establishments in Andhra Pradesh
Companies listed on the National Stock Exchange of India
Companies listed on the Bombay Stock Exchange